The Stambaugh Church of Christ is a historic church on KY 1559 at Frog Ornery Branch in Stambaugh, Kentucky.  It was built  and added to the National Register of Historic Places in 1989.

It has also been known as the Fraghonery Church. It was built by hand of hewn logs on property purchased for $10.00 in 1886.  It was later covered with dressed, hand-hewn wood.

References

National Register of Historic Places in Johnson County, Kentucky
Churches completed in 1887
19th-century churches in the United States
Churches in Johnson County, Kentucky
Churches on the National Register of Historic Places in Kentucky
1887 establishments in Kentucky